Aljos Farjon (born 1946) is a Dutch botanist specialized in conifers. 
After studying at Utrecht University he worked at Kew Gardens. He is a fellow of the Linnean Society of London since 1991. Farjon has published 80 papers and 7 books mainly on conifer systematics.

References

1946 births
Living people
20th-century Dutch botanists
21st-century Dutch botanists
Utrecht University alumni
Fellows of the Linnean Society of London